WCQS (88.1 FM) is the flagship National Public Radio member station for Asheville, North Carolina and Western North Carolina.  The station is owned by Western North Carolina Public Radio, Inc. and broadcasts a mix of NPR and BBC World Service news and entertainment programming, as well as locally produced speech and music shows.

Serving 11 counties across the mountainous terrain of Western North Carolina requires Blue Ridge Public Radio to broadcast on a host of sister stations and translators to effectively reach its audience. It can also be heard online via the Blue Ridge Public Radio app, and on the BPR website.

History
WCQS began August 28, 1975, as WUNF-FM, a 10-watt station (later upgraded to 110-watt station) operated by the University of North Carolina at Asheville from the Lipinski Student Center. Western North Carolina Public Radio bought the station in 1984, changed the call sign to WCQS, and immediately secured a membership agreement with NPR. While most of the station's coverage area was served by South Carolina Educational Radio's Upstate outlet, WEPR in Greenville, WNCPR wanted to build a station that would be tailored to the area's interests.

Eventually, the station increased its power to 1,600 watts, still a fairly modest level for a full NPR member on the FM band. This may be due to the need to protect WRVL in Lynchburg, Virginia, located at adjacent 88.3.

In 2005, WNCPR bought WVMH, a radio station operated by Mars Hill College, and changed its call sign to WYQS. Originally a straight simulcast of WCQS, it broke off in 2008 to air the BBC World Service full-time, and continued to do so until early 2017.

In the summer of 2010, Jody Evans joined WCQS as executive director, replacing Ed Subkis, who had held the job for 18 years. Evans wanted WCQS to become a source for news and information, and she planned on more local news coverage and working with other news media. Other than that, no major changes were planned. One joint project was live broadcasts from Brevard Music Center, which would use the resources of WDAV in the Charlotte area.

Evans said in February 2011 that WCQS would have more emphasis on local news, and that David Hurand's evening shows Byline, Conversations, and Evening Rounds would be dropped. Hurand added local news reports during the more popular shows Morning Edition and All Things Considered. Competition from television was one reason for the change. New national shows being added included Marketplace and The Splendid Table.

On March 24, 2013, WCQS added WMQS at 88.5 FM, to serve the Murphy area.

July 2015 saw the arrival of a new General Manager and CEO, David Feingold, with Matt Bush replacing Hurand as News Editor the following year.

Relaunch and BPR News 
In the spring of 2017, WCQS and its associated stations rebranded as "Blue Ridge Public Radio." WCQS (and its repeaters and translators) became "BPR Classic," retaining their established format of NPR programming and classical music. As part of the relaunch, on March 6, 2017, WYQS relaunched as BPR News, an all news-and-talk station airing BBC and NPR programming around the clock. Its launch ended the 24-hour relay of the BBC after almost a decade.

Since WYQS operates at only 100 watts, it is available on WCQS's HD subcarrier (WCQS HD-2) and online.

On October 11, 2022, it was announced the Blue Ridge Public Radio will swap its formats for WCQS and WYQS on October 31.

Programming 
On weekdays, WCQS takes NPR's Morning Edition from 5 till 9 each morning. The station's local Morning Classical Music program, with Chip Kauffman, airs from 9 to 12.

From noon till 1pm, Blue Ridge Public Radio airs The State of Things with Frank Stasio, a live show produced daily by North Carolina Public Radio with help from Blue Ridge Public Radio. The program concentrates on topics of interest in North Carolina and is broadcast from WUNC, with regular contributions from BPR helping to provide perspective and input from the northwest corner of the state.

WCQS has classical music, hosted by Joe Brant, weekdays from 1pm to 3pm, followed by Fresh Air with Terri Gross at 3pm. From 4-6.30pm, NPR's All Things Considered is locally hosted by Helen Chickering, with Marketplace at 6:30. From 7pm, the evenings are given over to a selection of classical concerts, jazz, Latino and other music programs - many produced locally - before joining the BBC World Service at midnight (1am on Sundays).

Weekend programs include NPR's Weekend Edition and Weekend All Things Considered, along with a selection of NPR and locally produced programs such as Wait Wait... Don't Tell Me!, Ask Me Another, This American Life and The Splendid Table. Some weekend NPR programs are not simulcast, with WCQS and BPR News having individual programming at some points across the weekend.

Nearly all of WCQS' spoken-word programming is simulcast on WYQS but, in time slots where WCQS airs music, WYQS airs news and talk programming, providing listeners with additional programming choices. On weekdays the BBC's Newshour is broadcast from 9am till 10am, followed by On Point from 10am till noon. In the afternoons, Here and Now goes out between 1pm and 3pm. Some daytime shows receive a repeat broadcast in the evenings on BPR News.

Repeaters
WCQS operates two full-powered satellites, WFQS in Franklin, at 91.3 FM and WMQS in Murphy at 88.5 FM, as well as nine low-powered translators to serve its vast and mountainous coverage area.

Translators

The Bryson City and Highlands translators are nominally part of the WFQS license.  However, WFQS is a straight simulcast of WCQS.

The reception areas of WCQS and BPR News (WYQS) overlap significantly in some areas due to the topography, giving listeners more programming choices. The station also makes efforts to push uptake of its mobile app and streaming services.

These are former translators that have been moved to new frequencies:

 95.3 W237AR, Hazelwood, North Carolina - moved to 102.9 W275BU
 101.7 W269AY, Highlands, North Carolina - moved to 103.3 W277CU

On October 31, 2022, W213BX will swap places with W268CL, which was simulcasting WCQS-HD2.

References

External links
 Listen Live
 
 
 

CQS
NPR member stations
Radio stations established in 1975
1975 establishments in North Carolina